The Global Journal of Environmental Science and Management is a quarterly peer-reviewed open access academic journal covering  environmental management. It was established in 2015. The founding and current editor-in-chief is Jafar Nouri (Tehran University of Medical Sciences).

Abstracting and indexing
The journal is indexed and abstracted in the following bibliographic databases:
CAB Abstracts
EBSCO databases
Emerging Sources Citation Index
Scopus

References

External links

Publications established in 2015
Quarterly journals
Creative Commons Attribution-licensed journals
Environmental science journals
English-language journals